A Death of Honor is a science fiction mystery novel by American author Joe Clifford Faust. It was published in 1987 by Del Rey Books.

Plot summary
The novel is set in a crumbling 21st-century America. D. A. Payne, a bioengineer, is the prime suspect when a dead woman turns up in his apartment. He takes on the task of clearing himself but what he uncovers changes his life.

Background
According to the author, A Death of Honor was originally envisioned as a collaboration between various authors. Having written the first chapter while working on his novel Desperate Measures, Faust decided to finish the book himself when the collaboration stalled. It was his first novel to be published.

Award nominations
1988 – Locus Poll Award, Best First Novel nominee

References

1987 American novels
1987 science fiction novels
American science fiction novels
American mystery novels
Debut science fiction novels
Biological engineering
Dystopian novels
1987 debut novels